The 1995–96 Segunda Divisão de Honra season was the sixth season of the competition and the 62nd season of recognised second-tier football in Portugal.

Overview
The league was contested by 18 teams with Rio Ave FC winning the championship and gaining promotion to the Primeira Liga along with Vitória Setúbal and SC Espinho. At the other end of the table Nacional Funchal, FC Famalicão and AD Ovarense were relegated to the Segunda Divisão.

League standings

Footnotes

External links
 Portugal 1995/96 - RSSSF (Paulo Claro)
 Portuguese II Liga 1995/1996 - footballzz.co.uk

Portuguese Second Division seasons
Port
2